Bengdubi is a military station in the Naxalbari CD block in the Siliguri subdivision of Darjeeling district  in the state of West Bengal, India.

Geography

Location

Bengdubi is located in a forested area.

Area overview
The map alongside shows the Siliguri subdivision of Darjeeling district. This area is spread across the foothills of the Himalayas and is a plain land gently sloping from north to south. While the northern part is mentioned as the Terai region, the larger southern portion forms the western part of the Dooars region. While 55.11% per cent of the population resides in the rural areas, 44.89% resides in the urban areas. On the western side the Mechi River forms a long border with Nepal. On the eastern side the Mahananda River forms a short border with Bangladesh.

Note: The map alongside presents some of the notable locations in the subdivision. All places marked in the map are linked in the larger full screen map.

Education
Army Public School, Bengdubi, is an English-medium coeducational institution established in 1961. It has facilities for teaching from class I to class XII.

Kendriya Vidyalaya, Bengdubi, is a Hindi and English-medium coeducational institution, affiliated with the Central Board of Secondary Education.

Healthcare
One of the Defence Hospitals, the 158 Base Hospital, is located at Bengdubi.

Leopard menace
A leopard was trapped in the Bengdubi tea estate after the forest department took steps to control leopard menace in the tea garden in 2019.

References

Villages in Darjeeling district
Indian Army bases